The Johnny Bright incident was a violent on-field assault against African-American player Johnny Bright by a white opposing player during an American college football game held on October 20, 1951, in Stillwater, Oklahoma. The game was significant in itself as it marked the first time that an African-American athlete with a national profile and of critical importance to the success of his team, the Drake Bulldogs, had played against Oklahoma A&M College (now Oklahoma State University) at Oklahoma A&M's Lewis Field. Bright's injury also highlighted the racial tensions of the times and assumed notoriety when it was captured in what was later to become both a widely disseminated and eventually Pulitzer Prize–winning photo sequence.

Assault
Bright's participation as a halfback and quarterback in the game between the Drake Bulldogs and Oklahoma A&M Cowboys on October 20, 1951, at Lewis Field was controversial even before it began. Bright had been the first African-American football player to play at Lewis Field two years prior without incident. In 1951, Bright was a pre-season Heisman Trophy candidate and led the nation in total offense. Bright had never played for a losing team in his college career. Coming into the contest, Drake carried a five-game winning streak, owing much to Bright's rushing and passing abilities.

It was an open secret that Oklahoma A&M players were targeting Bright.  Both Oklahoma A&M's student newspaper, The Daily O'Collegian, and the local newspaper, The News Press, reported that Bright was a marked man, and several A&M students were openly claiming that Bright "would not be around at the end of the game". Although Oklahoma A&M had integrated in 1949, the Jim Crow spirit was still very much alive on campus.

During the first seven minutes of the game, Bright was knocked unconscious three times by blows from Oklahoma A&M defensive tackle Wilbanks Smith. While Smith's final elbow blow broke Bright's jaw, he was still able to complete a  touchdown pass to Drake halfback Jim Pilkington a few plays later. Soon afterward, the injury forced him to leave the game. Oklahoma A&M eventually won 27–14.

Bob Spiegel, a reporter with the Des Moines Tribune, interviewed several spectators after the game, eventually publishing a report on the incident in the October 30, 1951, issue of the newspaper. According to Spiegel's report, several of the Oklahoma A&M students he interviewed overheard an Oklahoma A&M coach repeatedly say "Get that nigger" whenever the A&M practice squad ran Drake plays against the Oklahoma A&M starting defense prior to the October 20 game. Spiegel also recounted the experiences of a businessman and his wife, who were seated behind a group of Oklahoma A&M practice squad players. At the beginning of the game, one of the players turned around and said, "We're gonna get that nigger." After the first blow to Bright was delivered by Smith, the same player again turned around and told the businessman, "See that knot on my jaw? That same guy [Smith] gave me that the very same way in practice."

Photographic sequence
A six-photograph sequence of the incident captured by Des Moines Register cameramen John Robinson and Don Ultang clearly showed Smith's jaw-breaking blow was thrown well after Bright had handed the ball off to Drake fullback Gene Macomber, and was well behind the play. Robinson and Ultang had set up a camera focusing on Bright before the game after the rumors of his targeting became too loud to ignore. They rushed the film to Des Moines as soon as Bright was knocked out of the game. Ultang said years later that they were very lucky that the incident took place when it did; they had only planned to stay through the first quarter so they could have enough time to develop the pictures before the deadline. The sequence won Robinson and Ultang the 1952 Pulitzer Prize for Photography, and eventually made it into the November 5, 1951, issue of Life.

Aftermath
Oklahoma A&M's president, Oliver Willham, denied anything happened even after evidence of the incident was published nationwide.  This began a cover-up that would last over half a century; during that time, whenever the story was discussed, the standard response from A&M/OSU was "no comment".  The determination to gloss over the affair was so strong that when Robert B. Kamm succeeded Willham in 1966, he knew that he could not even discuss the matter even though he had been Drake's dean of men at the time of the incident.

When it became apparent that neither Oklahoma A&M nor the Missouri Valley Conference, to which both Drake and Oklahoma A&M belonged, would take any disciplinary action against Smith, Drake withdrew from the MVC in protest.  The Bulldogs would not return to the MVC until 1956 for non-football sports, and would not return for football until 1971.  Fellow member Bradley University pulled out of the league in solidarity with Drake and did not return for non-football sports until 1955; its football team never played another down in the MVC (Bradley dropped football in 1970). 

The incident eventually provoked changes in NCAA football rules regarding illegal blocking, and mandated the use of more protective helmets with face guards.

Johnny Bright

Bright's broken jaw limited his effectiveness for the remainder of his senior season at Drake, but he earned 70 percent of the yards Drake gained and scored 70 percent of the Bulldogs' points, despite missing the better part of the final three games of the season. Bright finished fifth in the balloting for the 1951 Heisman Trophy, and played in the post-season East–West Shrine Game and the Hula Bowl.

Following his 1952 graduation from Drake, Bright went on to enjoy a 12-year professional football career in the Canadian Football League, retiring in 1964 as the CFL's all-time leading rusher, and was inducted into the Canadian Football Hall of Fame in 1970.

Recalling the incident without apparent bitterness in a 1980 Des Moines Register interview three years before his death, Bright commented: "There's no way it couldn't have been racially motivated." Bright went on to add: "What I like about the whole deal now, and what I'm smug enough to say, is that getting a broken jaw has somehow made college athletics better. It made the NCAA take a hard look and clean up some things that were bad."

When asked about Smith, whom he had not seen since the incident, Bright said he felt "null and void" about Smith, but added: "The thing has been a great influence on my life. My total philosophy of life now is that, whatever a person's bias and limitation, they deserve respect. Everyone's entitled to their own beliefs."

Wilbanks Smith

Wilbanks Smith received over 1,000 letters regarding the incident. Most of the mail was hate mail or death threats, but some was congratulatory and thankful. Smith maintained that he was not racist, the hit was "not a racial incident," and that he had landed "the same hit" on a white player earlier in the game. He never apologized for the incident, but said in 2012 that he was glad the incident had helped to integrate college football, saying "It took me a long time before I could smile about it. But now I can. I think it was a tool [Civil Rights'] organizations used, and it was very effective." Smith died on January 14, 2020, at the age of 89.

OSU apology

On September 28, 2005, Oklahoma State University President David J. Schmidly wrote a letter to Drake President David Maxwell formally apologizing for the incident. The apology came 22 years after Bright's death.  Schmidly, reiterating a conversation earlier in the month over the phone, called the team's behavior that day "an ugly mark on Oklahoma State University and college football".

See also
 Jack Trice
History of African Americans in the Canadian Football League

References

Further reading

External links
Drake Heritage Collection - The Johnny Bright Story
The Johnny Bright Incident – 50 Years Forgotten by Ted Soutar
KCCI-TV8 Des Moines, Iowa – Drake Names Football Field After Johnny Bright: OSU Apologizes For Player's Actions
Digital file of the entire front page of newspaper with B&W photographic prints and article

College football controversies
Drake Bulldogs football
Oklahoma State Cowboys football
African-American sports history
History of African-American civil rights
Racially motivated violence against African Americans
Violence in sports
1951 college football season
Racism in sport
Crimes in Oklahoma
1951 in sports in Oklahoma
October 1951 events in the United States
African-American history of Iowa
African-American history of Oklahoma